The College of California was a private college in Oakland, California. It is a predecessor of the public University of California system. It was established in 1853 as the Contra Costa Academy. In 1868, it merged with the nascent Agricultural, Mining, and Mechanical Arts College to form what became the University of California.

History
In 1853, in the recently established town of Oakland, California, noted educators Rev. Henry Durant and Dr. Samuel H. Willey founded the Contra Costa Academy to provide boys with a liberal arts education with a strong emphasis on the classics. It was nominally nonsectarian with a general Christian atmosphere, although its trustees, educators, and supporters consisted of a coalition of Congregationalists and Presbyterians.

This private college preparatory school grew quickly and by 1855, with the benefit of some government grants and a new charter, the newly renamed College of California opened in what by then had become the city of Oakland, on the four blocks bounded by Twelfth, Fourteenth, Franklin and Harrison Streets.  Despite the new name, it did not add college-level courses until 1860.

Within a few years, the downtown Oakland site had become unsuitable, owing to a lack of room for expansion, and the crowdedness and general rowdiness of the area. In 1866, the college trustees sought out a quieter, more rural site for their College.  They planned to finance this expansion by selling land near the prospective college site.  To this end, they formed the "College Homestead Association" and purchased 160 acres (65 hectares) of land north of Oakland on a site that is part of the City of Berkeley today.  The College hired landscape architecture firm Olmsted, Vaux & Co. for recommendations on the site.  Olmsted produced a 25-page survey and plan, dated June 29, 1866. Olmsted's work is now regarded as part of the legacy of UC Berkeley's planning, even though it was largely discarded.

Sales of lots were less than had been hoped for.  Even worse, although the college's trustees and supporters strongly believed in the importance of a liberal arts education, there was not much local interest in pursuing one at the college level.  Meanwhile, the State of California had established an Agricultural, Mining, and Mechanical Arts College in 1866, but it existed only on paper as a placeholder to secure federal land-grant funds.

In 1867, Governor Frederick Low suggested a merger of the already-functional and land-rich but cash-poor College of California with the state college, which had money but nothing else.  On October 9, 1867, the college's trustees reluctantly agreed to the merger on the condition that the new institution would be a complete university with a liberal arts college (the College of Letters, now the College of Letters and Science).  They were aware the new state institution would have to be entirely secular but recognized it was more important to find some way to preserve the College of California's liberal arts educational mission as part of the new university.

The University of California was chartered with the enactment of the Organic Act on March 23, 1868, although it continued to use the College of California's Oakland facilities while the campus at Berkeley was being built.

In September 1873, the university moved, with great ceremony, to Berkeley.

The site of the College of California in Oakland has been designated California Historical Landmark #45. As of May 2019, the site of the plaque at the corner of Franklin and 13th Street has been under construction as part of the Atlas development by Carmel Partners.

References

External links
 Photographs and transcription of marker - Markeroni.com

University of California
University of California, Berkeley
History of Oakland, California
Education in Berkeley, California
Education in Oakland, California
California Historical Landmarks
Educational institutions established in 1855
1855 establishments in California